Wehbe Katicha (born in 1943) is a Lebanese politician and a former general in the Lebanese Army. He is currently a representative in the Lebanese parliament having been elected in May 2018 as a candidate of the Lebanese Forces party in Akkar.

Personal life and background 
Katicha was born to a Greek Orthodox family in Chadra, Akkar. He attended several elementary schools in Akkar then Apôtres high school in Jounieh and Furn el-Chebek's public high school. He joined the army in 1964 and stayed until his resignation in 1999. He earned a bachelor's degree in political science from the Lebanese University in 1980. Between 1999 and 2008, he wrote weekly military and political analysis about regional and international topics in Al-Massira magazine and other Lebanese and Arab newspapers. He was also a frequent guest of Lebanese TVs during recent armed conflicts, namely Iraq War and July War.

Military career 
Katicha followed successfully the Lebanese officer commissioning program and graduated first in his class as a Lieutenant in 1967. He then traveled to France in 1968 for a one-year training and pursued several training sessions in Lebanon, Egypt and France between 1972 and 1985.

Dates of ranks 
Platoon Commander: 1968
Company Commander: 1970
Battalion Commander: 1981
Brigadier General: 1994

See also
Lebanese Forces

References

1943 births
Living people
Eastern Orthodox Christians from Lebanon
Lebanese University alumni
People from Akkar Governorate
Lebanese Forces politicians